In geometry, the snub square tiling is a semiregular tiling of the Euclidean plane. There are three triangles and two squares on each vertex.  Its Schläfli symbol is s{4,4}.

Conway calls it a snub quadrille, constructed by a snub operation applied to a square tiling (quadrille).

There are 3 regular and 8 semiregular tilings in the plane.

Uniform colorings 

There are two distinct uniform colorings of a snub square tiling. (Naming the colors by indices around a vertex (3.3.4.3.4): 11212, 11213.)

Circle packing 
The snub square tiling can be used as a circle packing, placing equal diameter circles at the center of every point. Every circle is in contact with 5 other circles in the packing (kissing number).

Wythoff construction 

The snub square tiling can be constructed as a snub operation from the square tiling, or as an alternate truncation from the truncated square tiling.

An alternate truncation deletes every other vertex, creating a new triangular faces at the removed vertices, and reduces the original faces to half as many sides. In this case starting with a truncated square tiling with 2 octagons and 1 square per vertex, the octagon faces into squares, and the square faces degenerate into edges and 2 new triangles appear at the truncated vertices around the original square.

If the original tiling is made of regular faces the new triangles will be isosceles. Starting with octagons which alternate long and short edge lengths, derived from a regular dodecagon, will produce a snub tiling with perfect equilateral triangle faces.

Example:

Related tilings

Related k-uniform tilings
This tiling is related to the elongated triangular tiling which also has 3 triangles and two squares on a vertex, but in a different order, 3.3.3.4.4. The two vertex figures can be mixed in many k-uniform tilings.

Related topological series of polyhedra and tiling
The snub square tiling is third in a series of snub polyhedra and tilings with vertex figure 3.3.4.3.n.

The snub square tiling is third in a series of snub polyhedra and tilings with vertex figure 3.3.n.3.n.

See also

 List of uniform planar tilings
 Snub square prismatic honeycomb
 Tilings of regular polygons
 Elongated triangular tiling

References 

 John H. Conway, Heidi Burgiel, Chaim Goodman-Strass, The Symmetries of Things 2008,  
 
  (Chapter 2.1: Regular and uniform tilings, p. 58-65)
 p38
 Dale Seymour and Jill Britton, Introduction to Tessellations, 1989, pp. 50–56, dual p. 115

External links
 

Euclidean tilings
Isogonal tilings
Semiregular tilings
Square tilings
Snub tilings